Tu Mo Rong is a district (huyện) of Kon Tum province in the Central Highlands region of Vietnam.

References

Districts of Kon Tum province